Phyllonorycter olympica is a moth of the family Gracillariidae. It is known from central Greece.

The larvae feed on Quercus coccifera. They mine the leaves of their host plant. They create a lower-surface tentiform mine with one strong fold. Most frass is located alongside the cocoon. The roof of the mine is completely eaten out.

References

olympica
Moths of Europe
Moths described in 1983